(born 9 January 1961 in Kitakami, Iwate) is a Japanese musician; drummer and composer who is the only consistent member of the renowned progressive rock duo Ruins, as well as of Koenji Hyakkei. He is also a member of the progressive rock trios Korekyojinn and Daimonji. Outside his own groups, Yoshida is renowned for his tenure as drummer in the indie progressive group YBO2, a band also featuring guitarist KK Null, whom he also joins in the current line-up of Zeni Geva and he has played drums in a late edition of Samla Mammas Manna.  He has been cited as "[the] indisputable master drummer of the Japanese underground".

Along with his participation in bands, he has also released several solo recordings.

Discography

 Solo Works '88 (1988)
 Solo Works '89 (1989)
 Magaibutsu '91 (1991)
 Drums, Voices, Keyboards & Guitar (1994)
 Pianoworks '94 (1994)
 First Meeting (1995)
 A Million Years (1997)
 A Is for Accident (1997)
 PYN - songs for children who don't want to sleep (2015)
 PYN - L'élan créateur (2016)
With Ruins
 Ruins III (1988) (reissued as Infect in 1993)
 Stonehenge (1990)
 Burning Stone (1992)
 Graviyaunosch (1993)
 Hyderomastgroningem (1995)
 Refusal Fossil (1997/2007)
 Vrresto (1998)
 Symphonica (1998)
 Pallaschtom (2000)
 Tzomborgha (2002)
 Alone (2011)

With Koenji Hyakkei
 Hundred Sights of Koenji (高円寺百景) (1994, remastered and reissued in 2008)
 Viva Koenji! (弐(II)) (1997)
 Nivraym (2001, remastered and reissued in 2009)
 Angherr Shisspa (2005)
 Dhorimviskha (2018)

With Painkiller
The Prophecy: Live in Europe (Tzadik, 2013)

With Ron Anderson
RonRuins
NYJPN

With The Gerogerigegege
Instruments Disorder (1994)

References

External links
Official Website
New Official Website

1961 births
High Rise (band) members
Japanese composers
Japanese male composers
Japanese rock drummers
Living people
Mainliner (band) members
Musicians from Iwate Prefecture
Painkiller (band) members
People from Iwate Prefecture
Zeni Geva members